Tscherms is a comune (municipality) in South Tyrol in northern Italy, located about  northwest of Bolzano. Once part of the commune of Marling, Tscherms became a commune on its own in 1897.

Geography

Tscherms borders the following municipalities: Lana, Marling and Merano.

History

Coat-of-arms
The emblem is a rampant fox on or background. It is the sign of the Lords of Fuchsberg owners of the village from 1427 to 1832. The arms was adopted in 1966.

Society

Linguistic distribution
According to the 2011 census, 94.92% of the population speak German, 4.86% Italian and 0.23% Ladin as first language.

Demographic evolution

References

External links
 Homepage of the municipality

Municipalities of South Tyrol